The All India People's Front  (abbreviated as AIPF-R) is an Indian political party, based in the state of Bihar & Uttar Pradesh.

Spokesperson 
National - Sarwan Ram Darapuri

References

Political parties in Uttar Pradesh
Political parties with year of establishment missing
State political parties in Bihar